Ivory Coast competed at the 2000 Summer Olympics in Sydney, Australia. Nine athletes competed in seven events and won zero medals.

Athletics 

Men
Track and road events

Women
Track and road events

Judo 

Women

Swimming 

Men

Taekwondo

Wrestling 

Freestyle

References

External links
 

Ivory Coast
2000
2000 in Ivorian sport